Ishim may refer to:
Ishim (river), a river in Kazakhstan and Russia
Ishim, Tyumen Oblast, a town in Tyumen Oblast, Russia
Ishim (angel), a rank of angels in the Jewish angelic hierarchy

See also
Ishimsky (disambiguation)
Ishimbay